The relationship between Chile and the United States, which dates back to the 19th century, has improved significantly since 1988 and is better than at any other time in history. In the late 1980s and early 1990s, the US government applauded the rebirth of democratic practices in Chile, despite having supported the 1973 coup d'état and subsequent military regime.

Regarded as one of the least corrupt and most vibrant democracies in South America, with a healthy economy, Chile is noted as being one of the closest strategic allies of the United States in the Southern Hemisphere, along with Colombia, and remains part of the Inter-American Treaty of Reciprocal Assistance. A prime example of cooperation includes the landmark 2003 Chile–United States Free Trade Agreement. Chile is also the first South American nation to gain membership in the Organisation for Economic Co-operation and Development with the United States, as well as the only Latin American country to be included in the U.S. Visa Waiver Program.

The governments consult frequently on issues including multilateral diplomacy, security, culture and science. Recently the governments have signed agreements on education and green energy.

According to several global opinion polls, Chileans have a considerably positive opinion of the U.S., with 72% of Chileans viewing the U.S. favorably in 2015, and 62% of Chileans viewing American influence positively in 2013, the highest rating for any surveyed country in Latin America. According to the 2012 U.S. Global Leadership Report, 42% of Chileans approve of U.S. leadership, with 25% disapproving and 32% uncertain.

History

A colony of Spain, Chile previously had been an audiencia of the Viceroyalty of Peru. Napoleon's French armies invaded Spain in 1808 and imposed a new ruler. The invasion sparked revolutionary movements in Spain's American colonies. Chilean revolutionaries declared Chile's independence on September 18, 1810. Several years of fighting followed, but by 1822 U.S. James Monroe concluded that Spain was unable to recover its colonies. He decided on recognition and asked Congress for funds for Ministers Plenipotentiary for Chile, La Plata (Argentina), Colombia, Peru, and Mexico. Spain protested, but Congress provided the funding in mid-1822. In 1823, Monroe named Heman Allen of Vermont as Minister Plenipotentiary and Envoy Extraordinary to Chile.

After 1864 a series of small issues worsened relations. Chilean businessmen preferred working with British merchants.

War of the Pacific 1879-1884 
 
Washington favored Peru during Chile's War of the Pacific with Peru and Bolivia 1879 until 1884. It tried to bring an early end to the long-lasting war mainly because of US business and financial interests in Peru. Moreover, Washington worried that British merchants would take economic control of the region through Chile.  Peace negotiations failed when a stipulation required Chile to return the conquered lands. Chileans suspected the new US initiative was tainted with a pro-Peruvian bias. As a result, relations between Chile and the United States took a turn for the worse.

Chile instead asked that the United States remain neutral. The United States Pacific Squadron only contained a few wooden vessels, and Chile had two new armored warships.  The U.S. knew they were unable to match Chilean naval power and backed down.

Baltimore incident 1891 

In 1891 Washington favored the losing side in a civil war. It blocked the transfer of arms purchased illegally in California by the rebels in the Itata incident. The US minister harbored dozens of leaders of the losing faction in the embassy; they eventually left on American ships. To protect American interests during the civil war President Benjamin Harrison and his aggressive Navy Secretary Benjamin F. Tracy sent a warship, the "USS Baltimore"; unwisely the captain allowed shore leave for his men in the hostile port of Valparaiso. Trouble escalated into a street brawl, with two Americans dead, 17 injured and 36 in jail. This led to the major "Baltimore crisis" between the two nations, with loose talk of possible war. Chile at first denied responsibility, and the foreign minister attacked the U.S. Harrison demanded full satisfaction as a point of honor and demanded $75,000 in reparations. European powers favored Chile; they recognized American dominance in the region and did not intervene.  Argentina, and Peru, and to a lesser extent Brazil, had their own grievances against Chile and supported the U.S. Chile capitulated to Washington's terms and afterward built up its navy and its European connections.

U.S. Embassy

In addition to working closely with Chilean government officials to strengthen their bilateral relationship, the U.S. Embassy in Santiago provides a range of services to U.S. citizens and businesses in Chile. (see the embassy's home page for details of these services.) The embassy also is the focus for a number of American community activities in the Santiago area.

The public affairs section cooperates with universities and non-governmental organizations on programs, including U.S. Speaker, International Visitor, and Fulbright programs. Themes of include trade, international security, democratic governance in the region, judicial reform, law enforcement, environmental issues, and the teaching of English. The public affairs section works daily with Chilean media. It also assists visiting foreign media, including U.S. journalists, and is regularly involved in press events for high-level visitors.

Attachés at the embassy from the Foreign Commercial Service, Foreign Agricultural Service, and the Animal and Plant Health Inspection Service work closely with the hundreds of U.S. companies who export to or maintain offices in Chile. These officers provide information on Chilean trade and industry regulations and administer several programs intended to support U.S. companies in Chile.

The Consular Section of the Embassy provides services to U.S. citizens residing in Chile, currently of 19,000 people. It assists Americans  voting in U.S. elections while abroad, provides U.S. tax information, and facilitates government benefit and social security payments. About 170,000 U.S. citizens visit Chile each year. The Consular Section offers passport and emergency services to U.S. tourists during their stay in Chile. It also issues about 40,000 visitor visas a year to Chilean citizens who travel to the United States.

Visa Waiver Program
In February 2014, the U.S. government officially announced that it had added Chile to the Visa Waiver Program, enabling all Chilean citizens to travel the United States without payment of a fee beginning in May and making Chile the only nation in Latin America to possess such a privilege, one usually afforded to only the closest allies and partners of the U.S., such as countries of Europe, Australia, New Zealand, Japan, South Korea and Taiwan.

Resident diplomatic missions
 Chile has an embassy in Washington, D.C. and consulates-general in Chicago, Houston, Los Angeles, Miami, New York City and San Francisco.
 United States has an embassy in Santiago.

See also
 Chilean Americans
 Americans in Chile
 Letelier case
 United States intervention in Chile

References

 and

Further reading
 Burson, Phyllis J. "Chilean Americans." Gale Encyclopedia of Multicultural America, edited by Thomas Riggs, (3rd ed., vol. 1, Gale, 2014), pp. 479–490. online
 Cortada, James W. "Diplomatic Rivalry between Spain and the United States over Chile and Peru, 1864-1871." Inter-American Economic Affairs 27.4 (1974): 47-57.

 Evans, Henry Clay. Chile and its Relations with the United States (Duke UP, 1927). online
 Francis, Michael J. The limits of hegemony: United States relations with Argentina and Chile during World War II (U of Notre Dame Press, 1977)
 Goldberg, Joyce S. "Consent to Ascent The Baltimore Affair and the US Rise to World Power Status." Americas 41.1 (1984): 21-35.
 Holbrook, Francis X., and John Nikol. "Chilean Crisis of 1891-1892." American Neptune 38.4 (1978): 291-300.
 Hybel, Alex Roberto. The Making of Flawed Democracies in the Americas: The United States, Chile, Argentina, and Peru (Springer, 2019).
 Jensen, Poul. The garotte : the United States and Chile, 1970-1973 (1988) online

 Johnson, John J. "Early Relations of the United States with Chile." Pacific Historical Review 13.3 (1944): 260-270. online
 Leonard, Thomas, ed. Encyclopedia of US-Latin American Relations (3 vol CQ Press, 2012) esp pp 174–181.   
 Mares, David R. The United States and Chile : coming in from the cold (2001) online
 Moore, John Bassett. "The Late Chilian Controversy." Political Science Quarterly 8.3 (1893): 467-494. online
 Morley, Morris, and Chris Mcgillion. "Soldiering On: The Reagan Administration and Redemocratisation in Chile, 1983–1986." Bulletin of Latin American Research (2006) 25#1  pp: 1-22.
 Morley, Morris, and Chris McGillion. Reagan and Pinochet: The Struggle over U.S. Policy toward Chile (Cambridge University Press, 2015) 338 pp. 
 Pike, F. B. Chile and the United States: 1880–1962 (U of Notre Dame Press, 1963) online
 Sater, William F. Chile and the United States: Empires in conflict (University of Georgia Press, 1990).
 Sigmund, Paul E. The United States and Democracy in Chile (Johns Hopkins Univ Press, 1993) online
 Sobel, Lester A. Chile & Allende (Facts on File, 1974). highly detailed
 Whitaker, Arthur P. The United States and the southern cone: Argentina, Chile, and Uruguay (1976) online

External links

 History of Chile - U.S. relations

 
Bilateral relations of the United States
United States